Karen Arnold-Burger (born 1957) is the Chief Judge of the Kansas Court of Appeals.

Education and legal career
Arnold-Burger received her bachelor's degrees from the University of Kansas in 1978 and her Juris Doctor from the University of Kansas School of Law in 1981. Arnold-Burger served as First Assistant City Attorney for the City of Overland Park before accepting a position as an Assistant United States Attorney in Kansas City, Kansas. She was appointed to the Overland Park Municipal Court in 1991, and was appointed Presiding Judge of that court in 1996.

Appointment to Kansas Court of Appeals
Arnold-Burger was one of three nominees recommended for a seat on the Kansas Court of Appeals. She was appointed to the court by Governor Mark Parkinson on January 6, 2011 to the seat vacated by former Chief Judge Gary W. Rulon and was sworn in on March 4, 2011. Arnold-Burger was retained on November 6, 2012, and again on November 8, 2016. Her current four-year term expires on January 10, 2021.

She was selected by the Kansas Supreme Court as chief judge of the court of appeals for a four-year term beginning in January 2017.

Consideration for Kansas Supreme Court
Arnold-Burger was one of five candidates recommended by the Supreme Court Nominating Commission for a seat on the Kansas Supreme Court vacated by Nancy Moritz.

Teaching
She has been an adjunct faculty member at the National Judicial College since 2000, and was elected by her fellow faculty members to serve on the Faculty Council beginning in 2010.

Personal
She was born in Kansas City, Kansas in 1957. She and her husband have been married for 37 years and have three grown children and one grandchild.

See also 

 2020 Kansas elections

References

External links
Official Biography on Kansas Judicial Branch website

1957 births
Living people
20th-century American lawyers
20th-century American judges
21st-century American judges
Assistant United States Attorneys
Kansas Court of Appeals Judges
Kansas lawyers
Kansas state court judges
People from Kansas City, Kansas
University of Kansas alumni
University of Kansas School of Law alumni
20th-century American women lawyers
20th-century American women judges
21st-century American women judges